East Florida was a colony of Great Britain from 1763 to 1783 and a province of Spanish Florida from 1783 to 1821. Great Britain gained control of the long-established Spanish colony of La Florida in 1763 as part of the treaty ending the French and Indian War (as the Seven Years' War was called in North America). Deciding that the territory was too large to administer as a single unit, Britain divided Florida into two colonies separated by the Apalachicola River: East Florida with its capital in St. Augustine and West Florida with its capital in Pensacola. East Florida was much larger and comprised the bulk of the former Spanish territory of Florida and most of the current state of Florida. It had also been the most populated region of Spanish Florida, but before control was transferred to Britain, most residents – including virtually everyone in St. Augustine – left the territory, with most migrating to Cuba.

Britain tried to attract settlers to the two Floridas without much success. The sparsely populated colonies were invited to send representatives to the Continental Congress but chose not to do so, and they remained loyal to Great Britain during the American Revolutionary War. However, as part of the 1783 treaty in which Britain officially recognized the independence of thirteen of its former colonies as the United States, it ceded both Floridas back to Spain, which maintained them as separate colonies while moving the boundary east to the Suwannee River.

By the early 1800s, Spain had proved uninterested in and incapable of organizing or defending either of the two Floridas much beyond the two small capital cities. American settlers moved into the territory without authorization, causing conflict with the Seminoles, a new Native American culture which had coalesced from refugees of nearby southern states. British operatives fomented turmoil in Florida during the War of 1812 and prompted the involvement of American troops, all in Spanish territory. American settlers in East Florida further weakened Spanish control in 1812 when a group calling themselves the Patriots declared the short-lived Republic of East Florida at Amelia Island with semi-official support from the U.S. government.

Border disputes between the Americans and Seminoles in Florida continued after the war. By 1817, much of Spanish West Florida had been occupied and annexed by the United States over Spanish objections, with the land eventually becoming portions of the states of Louisiana, Alabama, and Mississippi. After a decade of intensifying border disputes and American incursions, Spain ceded both Floridas to the U.S. in the Adams–Onís Treaty of 1819. The U.S. officially took possession in 1821; in 1822, all of East Florida and the few remaining portions of West Florida were combined into a single Florida Territory with borders that closely approximated those of the current state of Florida.

British period

Under the terms of the 1763 Treaty of Paris, which ended the Seven Years' War (the French and Indian War), Spain ceded Spanish Florida to Britain. At the same time, Britain received all of French Louisiana east of the Mississippi River, with the exception of New Orleans, from France. Determining the new territory too large to administer as one unit, Britain divided its new southeastern acquisitions into two new colonies separated by the Apalachicola River: East Florida, with its capital in the old Spanish city of St. Augustine, and West Florida, with its capital at Pensacola. However, most of the Spanish population departed following the signing of the treaty, with the entirety of St. Augustine emigrating to Cuba.

The settlement of East Florida was heavily linked in London with the same interests that controlled Nova Scotia. The East Florida Society of London and the Nova Scotia Society of London had many overlapping members, and Council frequently followed their suggestions on the granting of lands to powerful merchant interests in London.

The apportionment of lands in the new colonies fell to the same group of English and Scottish entrepreneurs and merchant interests, led chiefly by the Englishman Richard Oswald, later a diplomat, and the British general James Grant, who would later become governor of East Florida. A list of the grantees in both Florida and Canada show that the plums fell to a well-connected—and inter-connected—group. Other aristocrats, nobles and merchants did the same.

The most powerful lubricant between the East Florida speculators and the Nova Scotia speculators was Col. Thomas Thoroton of Flintham, Nottinghamshire. Thoroton, the stepbrother of Levett Blackborne, had married an illegitimate daughter of the Duke of Rutland and often lived at Belvoir Castle, where he acted as principal agent to the Duke, who, along with his son the Marquis of Granby, were heavily involved in overseas ventures. Thoroton frequently acted as the go-between for Richard Oswald and James Grant, particularly after those two gave up their Nova Scotia Grants to focus on East Florida, where a drumbeat of steady speculation (particularly from Dr. Andrew Turnbull and Dr. William Stork) had fanned the flames of interest in London. It was not until March 1781 that the Governor of East Florida, Patrick Tonyn, called elections for a provincial legislature.

Both Floridas remained loyal to Great Britain during the American War of Independence. Britain used the territory as a temporary shelter for slaves as they attempted to remove all of them from the south. This slave removal was intended for dual-purposes; firstly, it would provide labor for other British colonies, in particular holdings in the West Indies, and secondly, it would impact the wealth and economic capabilities of the American revolutionaries.
 
Spain participated indirectly in the war as an ally of France and captured Pensacola from the British in 1781. In the 1783 Treaty of Paris, which ended the war, the British ceded both Floridas to Spain. The same treaty recognized the independence of the United States, directly to the north.

Demography

Racial demographics 
During the period of British rule in East Florida, the black population came to outnumber the white population in the province by a ratio of 2 to 1. The ratio of blacks to whites in East Florida was lower than in British West Florida but higher than in the other southern British colonies. Those who were white in Florida generally served in the military or worked as overseers, artisans, or merchants. There were very few white yeomen farmers. White residents generally lived in or around St. Augustine with an exception being generally made for overseers and those who resided in New Smyrna.

Population and other characteristics 
It is unclear what the population of East Florida was prior to the American Revolution but it is estimated to have had a population of close to 3,000, making it much larger in population than West Florida, which is believed to have had only several hundred residents. The British tried to encourage settlement in East and West Florida, thinking it would take pressure off the proclamation line that colonists in the northern British colonies wanted to move beyond. However, this plan was generally unsuccessful as many of those who got land grants did not end up settling on those lands. By 1783 the population of East Florida was about 17,000.

During the American Revolution, East Florida sided with the British and became a loyalist haven. With the end of the Revolution and the handing over of both Floridas to the Spanish, many loyalists were hesitant to leave. In the end, most of the loyalist and British residents, approximately 10,000 people, left with most of these going to the Bahamas or West Indies and some going to Nova Scotia and England. Another 4,000 people "melted away into the wilderness", with some going as far away as the Mississippi River.

A town named St. Johns Bluff or St. Johns Town was laid out in 1779 along the St. Johns River. The planned community was the first town to be established on the river. Most of those who fled to Florida settled at that town and St. Augustine. St. Johns Bluff became a port and had 300 houses in it by the spring of 1783. With the end of the British period, it was renamed as St. Vincent Ferrer before it was eventually abandoned.

St. Augustine, the capital of the colony, was much smaller and less advanced than the capitals of the other Thirteen Colonies.

Slavery and economics 
East Florida did not establish a formal slave code until 1782. Those who were black or of mixed race of European and African origin and could not prove they were free were considered to be slaves. During the American Revolution, many Georgians and Carolinians moved to Florida along with their slaves. The colonial government, along with slave-owners, used slaves to construct defensive fortifications. A militia act that allowed for conscripting slaves as laborers and soldiers was passed in 1781.

Goods produced and exported in East Florida included sugar, timber, indigo, rice, naval stores, and barrel staves; most of these goods came from plantations along the St. Marys and St. Johns rivers that used slave labor.

Bernard Romans wrote the first account of Spanish fishing ranchos existing along Florida's southwest coast in 1770. When the British took control of Florida, they monitored the fisherman but let them continue their activities. Governor James Grant was ordered to stop the fisherman from operating but did not enforce that order. At one point the fishing boats were suspected of being a threat to British control, but a complete review in 1767-68 found they were harmless.

Media 
The East Florida Gazette was a pro-loyalist newspaper that was published weekly in St. Augustine from 1783 to 1784. It was founded by a loyalist printer, John Wells, and his brother, Dr. William Charles Wells, who had moved to St. Augustine from Charleston, South Carolina. Prior to the establishment of a newspaper, most news came into St. Augustine through gazettes that were published in Savannah, Georgia, and Charleston.

Spanish period: Florida Oriental
 Under Spanish rule, the provinces of East Florida and West Florida initially remained divided by the Apalachicola River, the boundary established by the British. But Spain in 1785 moved it eastward to the Suwanee River.

Spain continued to administer East and West Florida as separate provinces. The Spanish offered favorable terms for acquiring land, which attracted many settlers from the newly formed United States. There were several territorial disputes between the U.S. and Spain, some resulting in military action, including the Patriot War in 1812 and the filibuster at Amelia Island in 1817.

An American army under Andrew Jackson invaded East Florida during the First Seminole War. Jackson's forces captured San Marcos on 7 April 1818; as well as Fort Barrancas at West Florida's capital, Pensacola, on 24 May 1818.

James Monroe's Secretary of State, John Quincy Adams, defined the American position on this issue. Adams accused Spain of breaking Pinckney's Treaty by failing to control the Seminoles. Faced with the prospect of losing control, Spain formally ceded all of its Florida territory to the U.S. under the Adams–Onís Treaty in 1819 (ratified in 1821), in exchange for the U.S. ceding its claims on Texas and the U.S. paying any claims its citizens might have against Spain, up to $5,000,000.

In 1822, the U.S. Congress organized the Florida Territory. In 1845, Florida was admitted as the 27th state of the United States.

Population and demographics 
With the transfer of Florida to Spain, a number of former British subjects decided to stay while some Spaniards came to Florida. St. Augustine had a mix of both residents from the British period and newly arrived Spaniards. The rural areas areas settled by colonists were described as being "exclusively Anglo". During the Spanish period, the population of St. Augustine "hovered" at about 3,000 people, with half of its population being black slaves. There were nine Native American towns in Florida, but those towns were not counted in the 1786 census.

Governors

List of governors of East Florida

See also
 The Republic of East Florida
 George Mathews (Georgia), Patriot War of East Florida (1812)
 Seminole Wars
 Mosquito County, Florida
 Spanish colonization of the Americas

References

External links 
 Spalding Plate at A History of Central Florida Podcast

1763 establishments in the British Empire
Colonial United States (British)
Colonial United States (Spanish)
Former British colonies and protectorates in the Americas
Former regions and territories of the United States
Pre-statehood history of Florida
Spanish colonization of the Americas
States and territories disestablished in 1822
British Florida